"Turtles all the way down" is an expression of the problem of infinite regress. The saying alludes to the mythological idea of a World Turtle that supports a flat Earth on its back. It suggests that this turtle rests on the back of an even larger turtle, which itself is part of a column of increasingly larger turtles that continues indefinitely.

The exact origin of the phrase is uncertain. In the form "rocks all the way down," the saying appears as early as 1838. References to the saying's mythological antecedents, the World Turtle and its counterpart the World Elephant, were made by a number of authors in the 17th and 18th centuries.

The expression has been used to illustrate problems such as the regress argument in epistemology.

History

Background in Hindu mythology

Early variants of the saying do not always have explicit references to infinite regression (i.e., the phrase "all the way down"). They often reference stories featuring a World Elephant, World Turtle, or other similar creatures that are claimed to come from Hindu mythology. The first known reference to a Hindu source is found in a letter by Jesuit  Emanuel da Veiga (1549–1605), written at Chandagiri on 18 September 1599, in which the relevant passage reads:

Veiga's account seems to have been received by Samuel Purchas, who has a close paraphrase in his Purchas His Pilgrims (1613/1626), 
"that the Earth had nine corners, whereby it was borne up by the Heaven. Others dissented, and said, that the Earth was borne up by seven Elephants; the Elephants' feet stood on Tortoises, and they were borne by they know not what." Purchas' account is again reflected by John Locke in his 1689 tract An Essay Concerning Human Understanding, where Locke introduces the story as a trope referring to the problem of induction in philosophical debate. Locke compares one who would say that properties inhere in "Substance" to the Indian who said the world was on an elephant which was on a tortoise, "But being again pressed to know what gave support to the broad-back'd Tortoise, replied, something, he knew not what". The story is also referenced by Henry David Thoreau, who writes in his journal entry of 4 May 1852: "Men are making speeches ... all over the country, but each expresses only the thought, or the want of thought, of the multitude. No man stands on truth. They are merely banded together as usual, one leaning on another and all together on nothing; as the Hindoos   made the world rest on an elephant, and the elephant on a tortoise, and had nothing to put under the tortoise."

Modern form
In the form of "rocks all the way down", the saying dates to at least 1838, when it was printed in an unsigned anecdote in the New-York Mirror about a schoolboy and an old woman living in the woods:

A version of the saying in its "turtle" form appeared in an 1854 transcript of remarks by preacher Joseph Frederick Berg addressed to Joseph Barker:

Many 20th-century attributions claim that philosopher and psychologist William James is the source of the phrase. James referred to the fable of the elephant and tortoise several times, but told the infinite regress story with "rocks all the way down" in his 1882 essay, "Rationality, Activity and Faith":

The linguist John R. Ross also associates James with the phrase:

Turtle world, infinite regress and explanatory failure 
The mythological idea of a turtle world is often used as an illustration of infinite regresses. An infinite regress is an infinite series of entities governed by a recursive principle that determines how each entity in the series depends on or is produced by its predecessor. The main interest in infinite regresses is due to their role in infinite regress arguments. An infinite regress argument is an argument against a theory based on the fact that this theory leads to an infinite regress. For such an argument to be successful, it has to demonstrate not just that the theory in question entails an infinite regress but also that this regress is vicious. There are different ways in which a regress can be vicious. The idea of a turtle world exemplifies viciousness due to explanatory failure: it does not solve the problem it was formulated to solve. Instead, it assumes already in disguised form what it was supposed to explain. This is akin to the informal fallacy of begging the question. In one interpretation, the goal of positing the existence of a world turtle is to explain why the earth seems to be at rest instead of falling down: because it rests on the back of a giant turtle. In order to explain why the turtle itself is not in free fall, another, even bigger turtle is posited, and so on, resulting in a world that is turtles all the way down. Despite its shortcomings in clashing with modern physics, and due to its ontological extravagance, this theory seems to be metaphysically possible, assuming that space is infinite, thereby avoiding an outright contradiction. But it fails because it has to assume rather than explain at each step that there is another thing that is not falling. It does not explain why nothing at all is falling.

In epistemology and other disciplines
The metaphor is used as an example of the problem of infinite regress in epistemology to show that there is a necessary foundation to knowledge, as written by Johann Gottlieb Fichte in 1794:

David Hume references the story in his Dialogues Concerning Natural Religion when arguing against God as an unmoved mover:

Bertrand Russell also mentions the story in his 1927 lecture Why I Am Not a Christian while discounting the First Cause argument intended to be a proof of God's existence:

Modern allusions or variations
References to "turtles all the way down" have been made in a variety of modern contexts. For example, "Turtles All the Way Down" is the name of a song by country artist Sturgill Simpson that appears on his 2014 album Metamodern Sounds in Country Music. "Gamma Goblins ('Its Turtles All The Way Down' Mix)" is a remix by Ott for the 2002 Hallucinogen album In Dub. Turtles All the Way Down is also the title of a 2017 novel by John Green about a teenage girl with obsessive–compulsive disorder.

Stephen Hawking incorporates the saying into the beginning of his 1988 book A Brief History of Time:

Former U.S. Supreme Court Justice Antonin Scalia discussed his "favored version" of the saying in a footnote to his plurality opinion in Rapanos v. United States:

Microsoft Visual Studio had a gamification plug-in that awarded badges for certain programming behaviors and patterns.  One of the badges was "Turtles All the Way Down", which was awarded for writing a class with 10 or more levels of inheritance.

American rock band mewithoutYou titled a song "Tortoises All the Way Down," as a play on this image, on their 2018 album [Untitled].

American hardcore band Every Time I Die titled a song “Turtles All the Way Down” on their 2009 album “New Junk Aesthetic”. The lyrics mention the turtle world theory.

In Terry Pratchett's Discworld, the titular flat planet is balanced on the backs of four elephants which in turn stand on the back of a giant turtle, while a small star orbits the assembly. The question of what the turtle stands on is acknowledged and dismissed: the turtle doesn't stand on anything; it swims through space.

See also

References

Notes

Citations

Further reading

Concepts in epistemology
Concepts in metaphysics
Concepts in the philosophy of science
Epistemological theories
Flat Earth
1830s neologisms
Legendary turtles
Metaphors referring to animals
Metaphysical theories
Religious cosmologies
Philosophical arguments
Philosophical problems